The discography of Joan Jett, an American rock singer, includes 44 singles and 12 studio albums.

As a part of Joan Jett & the Blackhearts, her most successful release is 1981's I Love Rock 'n Roll. The album reached number 2 on the U.S. Billboard 200 chart and was certified Platinum in the United States and as well as 2× Platinum in Canada while selling over 10 million copies worldwide. This album spawned two top-10 singles on the Billboard Hot 100, the highest being "I Love Rock 'n' Roll", which reached the top of the chart in 1982. It was then followed by "Crimson and Clover", which reached number 7 on the Billboard Hot 100 and number 60 on the UK charts. Two additional singles were issued, however, neither of which charted. "Do You Wanna Touch Me (Oh Yeah)" off Bad Reputation reached number 20 on Billboards Hot 100 chart.

After releasing three additional albums between 1983 and 1986, Jett returned with the album Up Your Alley, in 1988. It was a Top 20 album on the Billboard 200, and was her second (and final) Platinum certified album in the United States. The album featured the Top 10 single "I Hate Myself for Loving You". After the release of The Hit List in 1990, Jett charted again at number 47 on Billboard with the release of Unvarnished in 2013.  However, she released a string of compilation albums throughout the 1990s, and released six more studio albums, the most recent being Unvarnished in 2013.

Jett also co-wrote "House of Fire" in 1989  with American rock musician Alice Cooper, which was released on his 1989 album Trash. Desmond Child also co-wrote the song. The single was first released in the UK in late 1989, where it peaked at number 65. "House of Fire" was released in the US in early 1990 and reached number 56 on the Billboard Hot 100, and number 39 on the Mainstream Rock Tracks chart.

Her cover of "Love Is All Around" (the theme song of The Mary Tyler Moore Show) was used by the NCAA to promote the Women's Final Four, as well as the song "Unfinished Business", which was never commercially released. "Love Is All Around" went into radio play and became the number one requested song without an existing (support) CD.

Albums

Studio albums

Remix albums

Compilation albums

Extended plays

Singles

Other appearances

Studio

Guest

Music videos

See also 

 Evil Stig, 1995 studio album from a band formed by Joan Jett and members of the Gits

References 

Discography
Discographies of American artists
Rock music discographies